Sister Elaine Roulet (October 5, 1930 – August 13, 2020) was a Roman Catholic sister who created programs that connect incarcerated mothers and their children. She was instrumental in the prison reform movement and established the precedent of connecting imprisoned mothers with their babies that many United States prisons now use as a model.

Work
Roulet started her work initially wanting to teach the women inmates of a maximum-security prison in New York how to read. After being inspired to help them with what they really wanted, which was to know where their children were, she created a position that she called prison family liaison and served in that role for 10 years working with the prison and Catholic Charities. She founded Providence House Inc., an organization affiliated with Catholic Charities which manages sites that offer shelter and assistance to battered women and families, homeless women, and temporary housing for women recently released from prison.

Children's Center at Bedford Hills
She initiated then became the director of the Children's Center at Bedford Hills Correction Center,  a unique program that permitted mothers whose babies were born in prison to keep them for as long as one year. The Children's center provides a parenting center, a children's playroom, and a nursery and infant center to children of inmates. When the center first opened Sister Roulet was sought out by other men's and women's prisons for information on how to create similar programs and soon became a national model for prisons in terms of providing support for mothers and their babies in prison. A prison nursery was opened and operated in the Taconic Correctional Facility for women, across the street from the Bedford Hills Correctional Facility. Until 2011, Taconic also had a prison nursery; it was closed because of budget cuts and a low number of mothers and babies that was as high as twenty-six mothers and their babies for many years.

National Women's Hall of Fame
In 1993, Sister Elaine Roulet was inducted in the National Women's Hall of Fame.

Documentary about her work
The 2011 documentary, "The Mothers of Bedford" features the work of Sister Elaine Roulet.

References

External links
The Fledgling Fund - The Mothers of Bedford

Prison reformers
1930 births
2020 deaths
20th-century American Roman Catholic nuns
21st-century American Roman Catholic nuns